Huang Xiaowei (born 29 January 1962) is a Chinese engineer who is a researcher at the General Research Institute for Nonferrous Metals and director of National Engineering Research Center for Rare Earth Materials, and an academician of the Chinese Academy of Engineering.

Biography
Huang was born in Linli County, Hunan, on 29 January 1962. After resuming the college entrance examination, in 1979, she enrolled at Central-South Institute of Mining and Metallurgy (now Central South University), majoring in nonferrous metallurgy. She earned her doctor's degree in metallurgical engineering from Northeastern University in 2008.

After graduating in 1983, she was despatched to the Rare Earth Institute of Beijing Nonferrous Metals Research Institute, where she was engineer from 1983 to 1993 and to senior engineer from 1993 to 1998. She joined the Communist Party of China in June 1996. She is now a researcher at the General Research Institute for Nonferrous Metals and director of National Engineering Research Center for Rare Earth Materials.

Honours and awards
 27 November 2017 Member of the Chinese Academy of Engineering (CAE)

References

1962 births
Living people
People from Linli County
Engineers from Hunan
Central South University alumni
Northeastern University (China) alumni
Members of the Chinese Academy of Engineering